Munger district is one of the thirty-eight districts of Bihar state in eastern India. Munger city is the administrative headquarters of this district. Munger district is a part of Munger Division. Its literacy rate of 73.3% is higher than the state literacy rate of 63.8% and lower than national rate of 74.04.

The present collector and District Magistrate of Munger is Navin Kumar, IAS.
MP is Rajeev Rajan Singh Urf Lalan Singh

History
Munger has seen five districts partitioned off from its territory: Begusarai in 1972; Khagaria in 1988; and Jamui in 1991; and Lakhisarai district and Sheikhpura in 1994.

Geography
Munger District is located in the southern part of Bihar and its headquarters is located on the southern bank of river Ganges.

Politics 
  

|}

Economy
In 2006, the Ministry of Panchayati Raj named Munger one of the country's 250 most backward districts (out of a total of 640). It is one of the 36 districts in Bihar have been receiving funds from the Backward Regions Grant Fund Programme (BRGF).

Demographics

According to the 2011 census Munger district has a population of 1,367,765, roughly equal to the nation of Eswatini or the US state of Hawaii. This gives it a ranking of 358th in India (out of a total of 640). Its population growth rate over the decade 2001-2011 was 19.45%. Munger has a sex ratio of 879 females for every 1000 males, and a literacy rate of 73.3%. 27.79% of the population lives in urban areas. Scheduled Castes and Scheduled Tribes make up 13.44% and 1.56% of the population respectively.

Languages 

At the time of the 2011 Census of India, 61.76% of the population in the district spoke Hindi, 6.10% Urdu and 0.93% Santali as their first language. 30.56% of the population spoke languages classified as 'Others' under Hindi in the census. The local language is Angika, sometimes classified as a Maithili dialect.

Flora and fauna
comparatively equivalent to Russia's Urup Island.

References

External links 
 Munger District-Official Website

 
Munger division
Districts of Bihar
1832 establishments in India